Juan Palacios may refer to:

 Juan Palacios (basketball) (born 1985), Colombian basketball player
 Juan Palacios (boxer) (born 1980), Nicaraguan boxer
 Juan Palacios (cyclist) (born 1962), Ecuadorian cyclist
 Juan José Palacios (1944–2002), Spanish musician and record producer